Akodon polopi is a species of rodent in the family Cricetidae. It is found in Argentina.

References

Akodon
Mammals described in 2010